Edwin Stevens (August 16, 1860 – January 3, 1923) was an American stage and film actor. He also directed several films during the silent era.

Selected filmography

Actor

 The Man Inside (1916)
 The Devil's Toy (1916)
 The Yellow Menace (1916)
 The Squaw Man (1918)
 Cheating Cheaters (1919)
 The Lone Wolf's Daughter (1919)
 The Crimson Gardenia (1919)
 The Homebreaker (1919)
 Faith (1919)
 Upstairs (1919)
 The Profiteers (1919)
 Love Insurance (1919)
 Her Kingdom of Dreams (1919)
 Sahara (1919)
 The Unpardonable Sin (1919)
 Duds (1920)
 Passion's Playground (1920)
 The Figurehead (1920)
 Her Unwilling Husband (1920)
 Her First Elopement (1920)
 The Charm School (1921)
 The Sting of the Lash (1921)
 What's Worth While? (1921)
 One Wild Week (1921)
 The Dollar-a-Year Man (1921)
 Crazy to Marry (1921)
 Everything for Sale (1921)
 The Little Minister (1921)
 The Golden Gallows (1922)
 A Game Chicken (1922)
 The Ragged Heiress (1922)
 The Man Unconquerable (1922)
 The Hands of Nara (1922)
 The Voice from the Minaret (1923)
 The Spider and the Rose (1923)
 The Woman of Bronze (1923)
 Quicksands (1923)
 A Lover's Oath (1925)

Director
 The Honor of Mary Blake (1916)
 Susan's Gentleman (1917)
 The Boy Girl (1917)

References

Bibliography
 Langman, Larry. American Film Cycles: The Silent Era. Greenwood Publishing, 1998.

External links

1860 births
1923 deaths
American male film actors
American male stage actors
American film directors
People from San Francisco
Burials at Hollywood Forever Cemetery